My Animal Centre in Africa is a video game for the Game Boy Advance, Nintendo DS and Windows developed by German studio Braingame. It is similar to the game Pawly Pets: My Animal Hospital, except the player can look after different animals. The main character is a veterinarian, with an optional name, date of birth and place of birth. The title of the clinic is also optional. In the game, the goal is to look after wild African animals that are brought into the player's clinic by the gamekeeper. Like the game Pawly Pets: My Animal Hospital, there are three different difficulty levels; easy, medium and hard. Players will need to reach certain goals to advance to the next level, whereas in an open ended game, players can build enclosures as they wish. Some animals with problems can't be released into the wild, and so they must be looked after.

The game was created to be child-friendly, so when an animal is brought in, it doesn't act vicious or have any injuries. The game can teach people about wild African animals, and the medical problems that they can have.

Synopsis 
Players can play as a vet who has built a vets clinic in Africa to look after ill animals in the wild. A man called the gamekeeper will every so often come into the clinic with ill or injured animals. In the easy level, players will have three chances to diagnose the animal correctly, or the gamekeeper will take the animal away. At the beginning of the game, he will only bring in meerkats. As the game progresses, he will start to bring in Aardvarks, leopard cubs, Zebra foals, Lion cubs and Elephant calves. In a scenario, the meerkat enclosure will need to be built before the player can look after the meerkats, whereas in an open-ended game, the meerkat enclosure will already be built.

The animals that have major problems will remains in the enclosures. That means the player will have to look after them for a few days. Players will need to feed, play with and stroke them. Food comes in three tiers; normal feed, premium feed, and super premium feed. Normal feed is cheap to buy, whereas the premium feed will increase the animals energy meter more. With some animals, the player can bottle feed them. This increases their hunger, play and affection meters, but it also saves money, as if bottle feeding eliminates the need to buy food from the shop. 

It is important that players extend the enclosures to be able to hold more animals. There are two upgrades for each enclosure. The basic enclosure can hold two animals, the first extension holds three, and the final extension holds four animals. With each upgrade, you have the option to put in additional items. Unlike the Pawly Pets: My Animal Hospital game, the animals will actually use the items you put in their enclosures. The player also has a phone that can be used to receive in-game messages. Players can also read books, which must be bought and read in the right order. Reading all the books results in a certificate.  

In My Animal Centre in Africa, the vet has four health meters, rather than just two. There is the energy meter, that can be increased by eating.  Also, there is the fitness meter, which can be increased by resting on the sofa or sleeping. The player has the option to have the vet sleep from 2 to 8 hours. The vet also has a leisure meter, which can be increased by watching TV, or listening to music. The final meter is the health meter, which is kept high by keeping the other meters high as well.

See also 
Pawly Pets: My Animal Hospital

External links
Official website 

2006 video games
Virtual pet video games
Game Boy Advance games
Medical video games
Nintendo DS games
Video games developed in Germany
Video games set in Africa
Windows games
Single-player video games